The 2009 Capital One Bowl was held on January 1, 2009 at the Citrus Bowl in Orlando, Florida. The Georgia Bulldogs of the Southeastern Conference defeated the Michigan State Spartans of the Big Ten Conference by a score of 24–12. The game was televised to a national audience on ABC. The game was supposed to be a "showdown" between MSU RB Javon Ringer and Georgia RB Knowshon Moreno, but both players combined for only 43 carries and 109 yards, with Ringer scoring on a rushing touchdown and Moreno on a receiving.

Game summary

First half
The Bulldogs scored the first points of the game when Blair Walsh connected on a 32 yd field goal early in the first quarter. Michigan State would answer with a 20-yard field goal by Brett Swenson with 4:50 left in the first quarter. The Spartans would take the lead late in the second quarter with a 32 yd field goal of their own. Despite multiple turnovers neither Michigan State or Georgia could score a touchdown in the first half and Michigan State would take a 6–3 lead into halftime.

Second half
Both teams continued to struggle offensively until Georgia drove 96 yards and scored on a Matthew Stafford 35-yard touchdown pass to Michael Moore with 3:31 left in the third quarter. After forcing Michigan State to punt on their next possession, Georgia would score another touchdown off a 21-yard Matthew Stafford pass, this time to Aron White right before the end of the third quarter. Michigan State would pull within a touchdown after Javon Ringer finally found the end zone for the Spartans with 8:50 left in the fourth quarter. Michigan State attempted a two-point conversion to try to pull within three points of Georgia, however the attempt failed with an incomplete pass. This made the score 17–12. 
After a short possession by Georgia, Michigan State would get the ball back and would drive into Georgia territory, but turned the ball over on a failed fourth down conversion attempt. Georgia would seal the game when Knowshon Moreno scored on a 21-yard touchdown pass from Stafford with just 3:43 left in the fourth quarter.

Scoring summary

References

Capital One Bowl
Citrus Bowl (game)
Georgia Bulldogs football bowl games
Michigan State Spartans football bowl games
Capital One Bowl
2000s in Orlando, Florida
Capital One Bowl